Joyce Elaine Corrington ( Hooper; born August 5, 1936) is an American television and film writer. She was married to fellow soap-opera writer John William Corrington, who died in 1988.

Career
With her husband, she wrote five screenplays, Von Richthofen and Brown (1969), The Omega Man (1971), Boxcar Bertha (1971), The Arena (1972), and Battle for the Planet of the Apes (1973), and a television film, The Killer Bees (1974).

She served as Director of Research in Science and Associate Professor of Chemistry at Xavier University of Louisiana, in New Orleans.

She co-created the short-lived soap opera Texas, along with her husband and a fellow soap-opera colleague, Paul Rauch. She wrote for other serials, including Search for Tomorrow, General Hospital, and One Life to Live.  Her most recent position was as a producer and story editor for MTV's The Real World.

Selected filmography
The Omega Man - screenwriter (1971)

Boxcar Bertha - screenwriter (1972)

Texas - co-creator (with John William Corrington and Paul Rauch); co-Head Writer: 1980–1981

Capitol - co-Head Writer: 1982–1983

General Hospital - co-Head Writer: 1983

One Life to Live - co-Head Writer: 1983

Superior Court - co-Head Writer: 1987–1989

References

External links

 John and Joyce Corrington collection at The Historic New Orleans Collection

American soap opera writers
1936 births
Living people
American television producers
American women television producers
American women television writers
American women screenwriters
Women soap opera writers
21st-century American women